Mirabel is a suburb of Montreal, located on the North Shore in southern Quebec.

Mirabel is also the name of a territory equivalent to a regional county municipality (TE) and census division (CD) of Quebec, coextensive with the city of Mirabel. Its geographical code is 74.  Prior to 2002, Mirabel was not only a city but also comprised the Mirabel Regional County Municipality.

The city is home to Montréal–Mirabel International Airport.

History

Mirabel was formed through the expropriation of private lands and the merger of 8 municipalities in 1971. The former municipalities were (with their individual founding dates in brackets): Saint-Augustin (1855); Saint-Benoît (1855); Saint-Hermas (1855); Saint-Janvier-de-Blainville (1855); Sainte-Scholastique (1855); Saint-Canut (1857); Sainte-Monique (1872), and Saint-Janvier-de-la-Croix (1959). Initially called Ville de Sainte-Scholastique but renamed Mirabel in 1973, the city was planned to become a vast transportation and industrial hub for Eastern Canada, with Montréal–Mirabel International Airport at its centre.

Montréal–Mirabel International Airport, which opened in 1975, never became a major aviation hub and the industrial parks never materialized, and in 2004, the airport closed to all scheduled commercial passenger traffic. It continues to operate as a cargo airport and handles a few charter passenger flights.

Communities

Demographics 

In 2021, Mirabel was 91.8% white/European, 6.5% visible minorities and 1.7% Indigenous. The largest visible minority groups were Black (1.9%), Arab (1.6%), and Latin American (1.0%).

63.9% of residents were Christian, down from 87% in 2011. 56.7% were Catholic, 5.2% were Christian n.o.s, 0.4% were Protestant and 1.6% belonged to other Christian denominations and Christian-related traditions. Of non-Catholic denominations, the largest is Christian Orthodox at 0.7%. 33.6% of residents were non-religious or secular, up from 12.2% in 2011. 2.5% belonged to other religions, up from 0.8% in 2011. The largest non-Christian religions were Islam (1.9%) and Buddhism (0.4%).

90.8% of residents spoke French as their mother tongue. The next most common first languages were English (2.5%), Spanish (1.0%), Arabic (0.9%), and Portuguese (0.5%). 1.3% of residents listed both French and English as mother tongues, while 0.5% listed both French and a non-official language.

Climate

Economy

Bombardier Aviation produces Bombardier CRJ700 series (CRJ700, CRJ900 and CRJ1000) regional jetliners and Airbus A220 (formerly Bombardier CSeries) at the Montréal–Mirabel International Airport. Bell Helicopters (Bell Textron) also has its major manufacturing and final assembly plant at the airport.

HydroSerre Mirabel has its headquarters in the town.

Education

Commission scolaire de la Seigneurie-des-Mille-Iles
The Commission scolaire de la Seigneurie-des-Mille-Îles (CSSMI), which operates Francophone public schools, serves the following parts of Mirabel: Saint-Augustin, Saint-Benoît, Sainte-Scholastique and a portion of Domaine-Vert.
 École primaire de la Clé-des-Champs
 École primaire des Blés-Dorés
 École primaire Girouard
 École primaire Prés fleuris
 École primaire Sainte-Scholastique
Other elementary schools serving sections of CCSMI Mirabel: Notre-Dame-de-l'Assomption in Blainville and Terre-Soleil in Sainte-Thérèse. Secondary schools serving sections of CSSMI Mirabel: d'Oka in Oka, des Patriotes in Saint-Eustache, Henri-Dunant in Blainville, Jean-Jacques-Rousseau in Boisbriand, and Polyvalente Sainte-Thérèse in Sainte-Thérèse.

Commission scolaire de la Rivière-du-Nord
The Commission scolaire de la Rivière-du-Nord (CSRDN) operates Francophone public schools in other parts of Mirabel. They include:
Secondary schools:
École secondaire de Mirabel (ESM)
Other secondary schools serving CSRDN sections include Polyvalente Lavigne in Lachute and Cap-Jeunesse, Émilien-Frenette, Polyvalente Saint-Jérôme, and Saint-Stanlislas in Saint-Jérôme
Primary schools:
du Parchemin
à l'Unisson
aux Quatre-Vents
de la Croisée-des-Champs
Mer-et-Monde
Saint-Anne
Saint-Hermas
Other primary schools serving CSRDN Mirabel include Dubois, de l'Horizon-Soleil, Prévost, Saint-Jean-Baptiste, and Sainte-Thérèse-de-l'Enfant-Jésus in Saint-Jérôme and Jean-Moreau in Sainte-Sophie.

Sir Wilfrid Laurier School Board
The Sir Wilfrid Laurier School Board operates Anglophone public schools in the area around Mirabel.

Secondary schools serving portions of Mirabel include:
 Lake of Two Mountains High School in Deux-Montagnes serves southern Mirabel
 Laurentian Regional High School in Lachute serves northern Mirabel
 Rosemere High School in Rosemère serves southeast Mirabel

Primary schools serving portions of Mirabel include:
 Laurentia Elementary School in Saint-Jérôme serves northern Mirabel
 Mountainview Elementary School and Saint Jude Elementary School in Deux-Montagnes serve southern Mirabel
 Pierre Elliot Trudeau Elementary School in Blainville serves southeast Mirabel

Sister cities
 Châlons-en-Champagne (France)

See also
List of regional county municipalities and equivalent territories in Quebec
Mirabel Aerospace Centre
Saint Pierre River (Mirabel)
Rivière aux Chiens (rivière des Mille Îles)

References

External links

 Ville de Mirabel Website (French only)

 
Cities and towns in Quebec
Territories equivalent to a regional county municipality